Euonymus americanus is a species of flowering plant in the family Celastraceae. Common names include strawberry bush, American strawberry bush, bursting-heart, hearts-a-bustin, and hearts-bustin'-with-love. It is native to the eastern United States, its distribution extending as far west as Texas. It has also been recorded in Ontario.

The capsule splits into five sections, revealing seeds covered in bright red arils.

The seeds are dispersed by animals.  Deer have been known to graze on this plant and seem to love the tender leaves and stems. Humans should take the red color of the seeds as a warning; they are known to be a strong laxative and cause severe diarrhea. In fact, this genus of plants in general is considered poisonous to humans.

Description 
Euonymus americanus is a deciduous shrub that grows low to the ground only reaching up to 2-3.5 m high. Euonymus americanus grows white and green flowers that produce orange and red colored fruits. The white flowers on Euonymus americanus start to form unique pink fruit capsules that look somewhat like the common strawberry will start to open in the fall months revealing large orange seeds.

Taxonomy 
Euonymus americanus is one out of 1,300 species of the plants within the Celastraceae family which is also known as the Bittersweet family. Euonymus americanus L. was described by Carl Linnaeus in 1753. Some common names of Euonymus americanus include hearts-bustin'-with-love, bursting-heart, and the american strawberry bush. Euonymus americanus has three subspecies including Euonymus americanus var. angustifolius, Euonymus americanus var. obvatus and Euonymus americanus var. sarmentosus. The American Strawberry Bush also has eight different synonyms including Euonymus alternifolius and Euonymus angustifolius.

Distribution and habitat 
Although Euonymus americanus L. is one of the 1,300 species members in the Celastraceae family, it is the only Bittersweet family shrub that is found exclusively in the United States. The American strawberry bush is found in wetland areas such as margins of swamps, shaded stream banks, and sloped wetlands. However, though it resides in moist areas it is not a flood tolerant species; therefore, only being able to grow in moderately saturated soils. The shrub can grow in shaded conditions.

Traditional uses 
Native Americans used the roots of the Euonymus americanus to make a tea that would aid in uterine prolapse, vomiting of blood, stomach aches, malaria, liver congestion, constipation, and urinary tract infections. The bark of the shrub was also used in aiding dandruff control when the bark was turned into a powder like substance. Additionally, the seed of the American strawberry bush can be used as a strong laxative.

Conservation 
The American strawberry bush is common in most of its range. However, Euonymus americanus is listed as endangered in the state of New York.

Wildlife uses 
Euonymus americanus has vibrant fruits and foliage during the early autumn season which can attract white-tailed deer and rabbit herbivores The white-tailed deer also eats the twigs of the American strawberry bush. The bright orange-red aril that covers the seed provides a source of fat and sugar to songbirds, small mammals, and wild turkeys. The seeds of Euonymus americanus are dispersed by animals like birds and deer. It has been marked as a pollinator plant, supporting and attracting bees, beetles, flies, and ants.

Diseases and insect pests 

Unaspis euonymis also known as euonymus scale is the most common pest found on Euonymus. Scales have no legs that are visible to the naked eye and are small, motionless insects that vary in appearance depending on the sex and age of the scale. Euonymus scale's pierce the leaf or stem of the Euonymus plant and feed on the sap. The initial indication of an infestation of euonymus scale on the plant is the development of yellow spots on the leaves. A heavy infestation can be seen as clusters of white on the top and bottom of the leaf as well as the stems. These heavy infestations can cause the branches or even the entire plant to die.

Some common diseases that are developed in Euonymus include powdery mildew, anthracnose, cercospora leaf spot, scab, and crown gall.

Euonymus is host to webworm larvae of the American Ermine moth Yponomeuta multipunctella.

Gallery

References

americanus
Flora of the United States
Flora of Ontario
Plants described in 1753
Taxa named by Carl Linnaeus